Al-Bahrain Sports Club, otherwise simply known as Bahrain, is primarily a Bahraini football club based in the island-governorate of Al-Muharraq. Their football team plays in the Bahraini Second Division. Their home football stadium is the Al Muharraq Stadium, which they share along with their local island rivals, Al-Muharraq Sports Club. Bahrain Club also have teams for other sports, such as Basketball, Team Handball and Volleyball.

Achievements
Bahraini Premier League: 5
 Winners (5 times): 1968, 1978, 1981, 1985, 1989

Bahraini King's Cup: 2
 Winners (2 times): 1970, 1971

Bahraini Second Division: 1
 Winners (1 time): 2011

Performance in AFC competitions
 Asian Club Championship: 1 appearance
1991: Group was cancelled due to the crisis in the region.

Asian Cup Winners Cup: 1 appearance
1998 – 1st round

Former managers
 Rachid Ghaflaoui

References

External links
 Team's profile – soccerway.com

Football clubs in Bahrain